Víctor Antonio Lapeña Tortosa (born 12 March 1975, in Zaragoza) is a Spanish basketball coach who is the head coach of the Canada women's national basketball team.

Club career
He coached several teams in Spain, both in the second tier league (2003-2008) and the first tier league (2008-2018). He won the Spanish League in the 2012-13 season, and the 2014 Spanish Cup with CB Avenida.

In the 2018-2019 season he coached his first team abroad, Nadezhda Orenburg from the Russian Premier League, winning the second-tier 2018–19 EuroCup Women. On 29 June 2019 he signed for Turkish club Fenerbahçe

National team
Lapeña has worked with the Spanish Basketball Federation as both assistant and head coach in the youth teams and the senior team, winning a total of 14 medals. In November 2015 he was the head coach of the senior team for two games.

  2007 FIBA Europe Under-20 Championship (youth) (assistant coach)
  2007 Eurobasket (senior) (assistant coach)
  2009 Eurobasket (senior) (assistant coach)
 8th  2010 FIBA Under-17 World Championship (youth) (head coach)
  2011 FIBA Europe Under-16 Championship (youth) (assistant coach)
  2012 FIBA Under-17 World Championship (youth) (head coach)
  2013 FIBA Europe Under-18 Championship (youth) (head coach)
  2013 Eurobasket (senior) (assistant coach)
  2014 FIBA Under-17 World Championship (youth) (head coach)
  2014 World Championship (senior) (assistant coach)
  2015 FIBA Europe Under-18 Championship (youth) (head coach)
  2015 Eurobasket (senior) (assistant coach)
 7th 2016 FIBA Under-17 World Championship (youth) (head coach)
  2016 Summer Olympics (senior) (assistant coach)
  2017 Eurobasket (senior) (assistant coach)
  2018 World Championship (senior) (assistant coach)

References

1975 births
Living people
Spanish basketball coaches